Jubilee (full title Jubilee -Method of Inheritance-) is the major label debut album by Versailles, but is actually their second full-length release. Released on January 20, 2010, it's their last to feature all five original members, due to Jasmine You's death while recording it, bass parts are provided by both Jasmine You and Hizaki. Synthpop singer Kaya also appears in this album by providing backing vocals as a guest on the tracks "Ai to Kanashimi no Nocturne" and "Catharsis".
 
The limited edition comes in a special package with a 32-page booklet and liner notes written by Tsuchiya Kyousuke and Arasawa Junko (Shoxx). Also included in the limited edition is a bonus DVD featuring the music videos for "Ascendead Master" and "Serenade", and behind the scenes footage playing behind the credits.

Track listing

References 

Versailles (band) albums
2010 albums